The Costume Designers Guild, Local 892, is a union of professional costume designers, assistant costume designers, and illustrators working in film, television, commercials and other media. The CDG is not an employment agency, it is a labor union. As a member of the International Alliance of Theatrical Stage Employees (IATSE), the CDG protects member’s wages and working conditions through collective bargaining. There are many additional benefits to being a member, among them health insurance and a pension, as well as being a part of a vibrant community of over 1200 members, as of July 2021, who shape future policy through participation, share ideas, and support each other.

Since 2005, the CDG has published a quarterly publication, The Costume Designer Magazine. Additionally, they have a CDG Newsletter for members. The Costume Designers Guild Awards recognizes excellence in costume design in motion pictures, television, and commercials, and other media.

In 1976, the Costume Designers Guild joined the International Alliance of Theatrical Stage Employees (IATSE), becoming Local 892 of the IATSE.

Costume Designers Guild Awards
Founded in 1999, the Costume Designers Guild Awards honors costume designers in film, television, commercials, and other media. The statuette was originally manufactured in sterling silver by the Greek jeweler Bulgari, and was designed by CDG member, David Le Vey. In addition, one distinguished costume designer is selected to receive a Career Achievement Award. Actors, directors or producers are also honored with a Spotlight Award, and a Distinguished Collaborator Award.

Award categories
Film:
Excellence in Contemporary Film
Excellence in Period Film
Excellence in Sci-Fi/Fantasy Film
Television:
Excellence in Contemporary Television
Excellence in Period Television
Excellence in Sci-Fi/Fantasy Television
Excellence in Short Form Design
Special Awards:
Career Achievement Award
Additional Awards:
Spotlight Award
Distinguished Collaborator Award

List of winners

Excellence in Costume Design for a Contemporary Film
This award has been presented at each of the annual awards. 

Excellence in Costume Design for a Period Film
This award has been presented at each annual awards. The awards from 1999 to 2004 were for Period and Fantasy films combined.

Excellence in Costume Design for a Fantasy Film
This award was a part of the Excellence in Costume Design for a Period Film until 2005.

Excellence in Costume Design for a Contemporary Television Series

Excellence in Costume Design for a Period Television Series

Excellence in Costume Design for a Fantasy Television Series

Best Costume Design – Period or Fantasy TV Series
This award was presented at each annual awards from 2000–14, before being split into Period Television Series and Fantasy Television Series in 2015. 

Excellence in Short Form Design
This award has been presented at each annual awards from 2003–Present.

Best Costume Design – Miniseries or TV Film
This award was first presented at the 8th annual awards, for 2005 filmmaking.

Hall of Fame Award

See also

25th Annual Awards 2023
24th Annual Awards 2022
23rd Annual Awards 2021
22nd Annual Awards 2020
21st Annual Awards 2019
20th Annual Awards 2018
19th Annual Awards 2017
18th Annual Awards 2016
17th Annual Awards 2015
16th Annual Awards 2014
15th Annual Awards 2013
14th Annual Awards 2012
13th Annual Awards 2011
12th Annual Awards 2010
11th Annual Awards 2009
10th Annual Awards 2008
9th Annual Awards 2007
8th Annual Awards 2006
7th Annual Awards 2005
6th Annual Awards 2004
5th Annual Awards 2003
4th Annual Awards 2002
3rd Annual Awards 2001
2nd Annual Awards 2000
1st Annual Awards 1999

References

External links
Official website
Costume Designers Guild collection, Margaret Herrick Library, Academy of Motion Picture Arts and Sciences

1953 establishments in California

Costume design
International Alliance of Theatrical Stage Employees
Trade unions established in 1953
Guilds in the United States